Carpet is the second and final studio album by Swedish death metal band Ceremonial Oath.

Track listing

 "The Day I Buried" – 6:06 
 "Dreamsong" – 3:44
 "Carpet" – 3:30
 "The Shadowed End" – 3:16
 "One of Us/Nightshade" – 3:54
 "Immortalized" – 3:48
 "Hallowed Be Thy Name" – 6:46 (Iron Maiden cover)

Credits
Ceremonial Oath
Anders Fridén - vocals
Anders Iwers - guitar
Mikael Andersson - guitar
Tomas Johansson - bass 
Markus Nordberg - drums

Guest
Tomas Lindberg - vocals

1995 albums
Ceremonial Oath albums